Warsaw Szybka Kolej Miejska (SKM; which translates as 'Rapid Urban Rail') is mixed rapid transit and commuter rail system in the Warsaw metropolitan area, established on the existing national rail network within the city, constituting a part of the city's integrated public transport system organized by the Warsaw Transport Authority.

History 
The Warsaw SKM was initially proposed in 2002, stipulating to use the existing infrastructure of the Warsaw Railway Junction, especially the cross city line with its over 2 km long tunnel running under the city center and conveniently located underground station, as a cheap substitute for a badly needed second metro line whose construction did not start until 2014.

In order to implement this the then-Mayor of Warsaw Lech Kaczyński established in 2004 the municipally-owned company Szybka Kolej Miejska Sp. z o.o. The company was originally incorporated as a joint venture between the City of Warsaw with 50% shares and the companies Metro Warszawskie Sp. z o.o. with 49% shares and Tramwaje Warszawskie Sp. z. o.o. with 1% shares, both owned entirely by the city and responsible respectively for the Metro and Tram system. As such the company is notably completely independent from the national rail operator PKP Group, unlike Koleje Mazowieckie established by the Masovian Voivodship at around the same time.

The newly formed company was equipped with six Newag 14WE EMUs which were an extensive modernization of the PKP class EN57 EMUs commonly used on regional routes at the time, with a modern looking body but retaining the old mechanical components.

A year and a half after being established the SKM initiated its operation with its first trains, opening a single line from Warszawa Zachodnia along the cross city line to Warszawa Wschodnia and along the Vistula river to Warszawa Falenica. The new service failed to deliver on its promise to serve as a viable replacement due to the poor state of the rail infrastructure. Passengers within the city center preferred the more accessible trams system and few people wanted to use the trains in the southeastern districts of the city. Additionally, while the integrated fare system of the Warsaw Transit Authority offered a large convenience the modern look and relative cleanness of the rolling stock sharply contrasted with the standard found in the Polish railroad, during rush hours most of the slots on the tracks were taken up by regional traffic and the new EMUs suffered from the same technical problems as the ones they were based on.

Due to the initial low popularity of the line the original concept was somewhat altered in 2006 with the line extended outside the administrative borders of the city through the Ursus district into the town of Pruszków to the west and diverted to the district of the Wesoła and the town of Sulejówek to the east, turning the service into a suburban commuter network which allowed people in the metropolitan area to quickly reach the city center and conveniently transfer within the city's public transit system. The revised formula proved to be very successful leading the city to take the purchase of all the shares of the company and purchase two more Newag 14WE EMUs. The popularity of trains run the SKM was also instrumental in the city negotiating a deal with the Masovian Voivodship to have Koleje Mazowieckie honor long term tickets of the Warsaw Transit Authority, first along the route of the SKM and eventually within the entire area served by the city's public transit system.

In 2010 the company purchased four brand new Newag 19WE EMUs and opened a new line to the town of Otwock. Additionally, the Warsaw Transit Authority signed a contract with the Koleje Mazowieckie to operate a line between Warszawa Gdańska station on the Warsaw Circumferential Line and the town of Legionowo under the branding of the SKM, and since 2012 taken over by the company.

In 2011 13 new PESA 27WE 'ELF' EMUs (2011–2012) were purchased. In 2012 a new airport rail link was created running through the Służewiec office district and a newly opened 1.5 km rail tunnel to Warsaw Chopin Airport.

In 2012 the company purchased 9 Newag 35WE units.

In 2020  SKM has awarded Newag a contract to supply 21 Impuls 2 EMUs. The trains feature air-conditioning, a passenger information system, ticket vending machines and validators, Wi-Fi, USB sockets and an AED defibrillator.

In January 2022 Newag has delivered the first two Impuls 2 EMUs 

As of July 2022, SKM operates on three routes (S1, S2, S3), serving 51 stations in Warsaw and neighboring towns.

Rolling stock

Lines
As of March 2023 SKM operates 5 lines:

S1 line 
Pruszków – Otwock

The line was established in October 2005, running from Warszawa Falenica to Warszawa Zachodnia and suspended indefinitely in July 2006 with all of the rolling stock directed to the newly created line S2. In September 2010 the line was re-established and extended towards the town of Otwock, south east of Warsaw, but only reaching Warszawa Wschodnia, which required most of the potential passengers to transfer there to trains running on the line S2 or regional trains operated by Koleje Mazowieckie to reach the city. The line was extended through Warszawa Śródmieście and Warszawa Zachodnia to Pruszków in December 2010.

S2 line 
Warszawa Aleje Jerozolimskie – Sulejówek Miłosna

The line was established in July 2006 running from Pruszków through Warszawa Śródmieście to Sulejówek Miłosna. In December 2010 the line was shortened to Warszawa Zachodnia in the West, with the line S1 taking over the route from Pruszków to Warszawa Zachodnia and further to Warszawa Śródmieście. In June 2012 the line was extended from Warszawa Zachodnia through the Służewiec office district and a newly opened rail tunnel to an underground station at the Warsaw Chopin Airport.

S3 line 
Warsaw Chopin Airport – Wieliszew / Radzymin

The line was established in June 2012 connecting the Warsaw Frédéric Chopin Airport through the city center with the town of Legionowo north east of Warsaw. The line goes through the Warszawa Centralna railway station which usually serves long-distance trains.

S4 line
Piaseczno – Wieliszew

Line started running on 12 March 2023. It connects city of Piaseczno in south-west with Wieliszew in north-east, running through Warsaw and crossing the Vistula by northern railway bridge. Large stations it stops at are Warszawa Zachodnia (stops at the Platform 9) and Warszawa Gdańska.

S40 line
Piaseczno – Warszawa Główna

Line started running on 13 March 2023. One train per hour on working days connets city of Piaseczno with central Warsaw. Trains departure by turns with S4 line.

Former lines

Line S9 (Warszawa Zachodnia – Legionowo) 
The line was established in March 2010, running between Warszawa Gdańska and Legionowo with some trains reaching Wieliszew. It was initially operated by Koleje Mazowieckie and, from 5 September 2011, gradually taken over by SKM. Since December 2011 the line is fully operated by SKM. From 1 September 2012, the line extended from Warszawa Gdańska to Platform 8 of Warszawa Zachodnia.

As of 2022, S9 services remain suspended until further notice.

See also 
Warszawska Kolej Dojazdowa (WKD) - Light rail commuter line in Poland's capital city of Warsaw.
Koleje Mazowieckie (KM) - Regional rail operator in the Masovian Voivodeship of Poland.
Polskie Koleje Państwowe S.A. - Dominant railway operator in Poland.
Polregio - Polish railway operator; formerly Przewozy Regionalne.

References

  Official site

External links

 

Railway companies of Poland
Public transport in Poland
Rapid transit in Poland
Transport in Warsaw
Companies based in Warsaw
Railway companies established in 2004
Polish companies established in 2004